The Carroll Fighting Saint football program represents Carroll College of Helena, Montana in college football. The team competes in the Frontier Conference, which is affiliated with the National Association of Intercollegiate Athletics (NAIA). The Carroll Fighting Saints football team began playing in 1920 and is one of the most successful programs in the NAIA division of college football. The program has won six NAIA Football National Championships (2002, 2003, 2004, 2005, 2007, 2010) and 40 conference championships, 14 while a member of the Montana Collegiate Conference and 26 as a member of the  Frontier Conference. The team is currently coached by Troy Purcell who is in his first season at Carroll.  The Carroll College Fighting Saints play their home games on campus at Nelson Stadium.

Brandon Day, a linebacker on the team in 2007, made the December 24, 2007 cover of Sports Illustrated.

Notable alumni 
In addition, the Carroll program has developed many well known talents either as a coach or a player, including the winningest coach in college football history, John Gagliardi, former Detroit Lions tight end, Casey FitzSimmons, and former Louisville Cardinals football head coach, Bobby Petrino. The team is currently coached by Troy Purcell and plays its home games on campus at Nelson Stadium.

Championships

National Championship game appearances

Conference championships

References

External links
 

 
American football teams established in 1920
1920 establishments in Montana